Ethmia normgershenzi is a moth in the family Depressariidae. The habitat consists of rain forests.

The ground color of the forewings is whitish with blackish markings and two distinct spots at the base, as well as an oblique irregular dark blotch before the middle and directed to but unattached to an elongated mark line from the middle to the termen. The hindwing ground colour is whitish, but darker at the margins.

The larvae feed on Drymonia alloplectoides, Drymonia macrophylla and Drymonia serrulata.

Etymology
The species is named in honor of Norm Gershenz.

References

Moths described in 2014
normgershenzi